Yan Dinghao (born 6 April 1998) is a Chinese footballer who currently plays for Chinese Super League side Guangzhou Evergrande.

Club career
Yan Dinghao would play for the Hangzhou Greentown youth team before he joined Portuguese club Porto's youth team on 5 August 2016 with a three year contract. He would work his way up through the youth teams and was promoted to the Porto B team, the reserve side who are allowed to participate within the Portuguese football league pyramid, however he was loaned to third tier football club Salgueiros to gain more playing time. On 7 February 2018, Yan made his senior debut in a league game for Salgueiros against Freamunde in  3-1 defeat. At the end of the season, Yan would go on to have moves with other Portuguese teams in Arouca and Gondomar before returning to China when he joined top tier club Guangzhou Evergrande on 28 February 2019, initially on a loan. On 6 April 2019, Yan would make his debut for the team in a league game against Guangzhou R&F F.C. that ended in a 2-0 victory. As the season went on he would become a regular within the team and would go on to win the 2019 Chinese Super League title with the club.

Career statistics

Honours

Club
Guangzhou Evergrande
Chinese Super League: 2019

References

External links

1998 births
Living people
Chinese footballers
High School Affiliated to Renmin University of China alumni
Chinese expatriate footballers
Association football midfielders
Campeonato de Portugal (league) players
Chinese Super League players
Zhejiang Professional F.C. players
FC Porto players
FC Porto B players
S.C. Salgueiros players
F.C. Arouca players
Gondomar S.C. players
Guangzhou F.C. players
Chinese expatriate sportspeople in Portugal
Expatriate footballers in Portugal